Aubuchon Hardware is a family owned hardware store chain in the northeastern United States consisting of 105  paint and hardware stores throughout Vermont, Massachusetts, New Hampshire, Maine, Connecticut and upstate New York.

History
Founded by William E. Aubuchon in 1908, in Fitchburg, Massachusetts, Aubuchon Hardware is the oldest family-owned and managed hardware store chain in America. With more than 100 stores in New England, Upstate New York, Virginia and Pennsylvania they have been a local mainstay for generations.

References

External links
 Hardwarestore.com website

Companies based in Worcester County, Massachusetts
Economy of the Northeastern United States
Hardware stores of the United States
Retail companies established in 1908
1908 establishments in Massachusetts